Smeeton Westerby is a village and civil parish in the Harborough district, located approximately nine miles south east from Leicester. Smeeton Westerby is situated in the Leicestershire countryside. It is close to Saddington, Kibworth and Fleckney and is situated 500m North of the Grand union canal. Smeeton Westerby is approximately 6.8 miles from the nearest railway station which is located in Market Harborough.  
The closest area for shops is Kibworth, which is approximately 1.4 miles North of Smeeton Westerby. Kibworth has numerous shops and in 2002 many new shops appeared, including a new branch of the Co-op UK. 
Smeeton Westerby doesn't have any shops of its own but it does have a traditional village pub, a village hall, a parish church plus several stables and farms.

History

In 1870-72, John Marius Wilson's Imperial Gazetteer of England and Wales described Smeeton Westerby as:

"…a township-chapelry in Kibworth-Beauchamp parish, Leicester; ½ a mile S of Kibworth r. station, 1 NE of the Grand Union canal, and 5¼ NW of Market -Harborough. Post town, Kibworth-Harcourt, under Leicester. Real property, £3,293. Pop., 533. Houses, 114. The property is much subdivided. The canal here burst its banks in Sept. 1865, and was emptied for a distance of 10 miles. The living is a rectory in the diocese of Peterborough. Value, £200. Patron, the Rector of Kibworth. The church was built in 1849."

Originally Smeeton and Westerby were two separate hamlets of Smeeton and Westerby but they merged some time ago to become the village that it is today.
The occupation in Smeeton Westerby has changed considerably over the last 130 years. The Vision of Britain website shows the main occupations in 1881 was domestic services for women and agriculture for men. 
As it is a conservation village there has been little change to the size of the village throughout its history apart from the small developments on the former factory site and Mill Lane. In 1975 an ancient burial site of the Beaker people was discovered just outside the village.

Places of interest

Church

The local parish church in Smeeton Westerby is an important part in the local community. The church not only acts as a place of worship but a place that encourages the local community which makes the village cohesive.  For instance, every first Thursday the Church runs a pram club, this is for pre-school children and their carers and includes activities such as crafts, songs and refreshments.
The church was consecrated on 31 August 1849 and was designed by Henry Woodyer an architect of the Oxford movement and a graduate of Merton College.

Demographics

Population

The initial census data for Smeeton Westerby given on the Vision of Britain website was 390 for the population in 1881. For the next 40 years the pattern of total population decreased, in 1921 the population of Smeeton Westerby was 302. There was a boom in population the following 10 years and in 1931 the population had increased to 343. The population dropped in 1961 the total population stood at 275, the lowest it had ever been. In 2001 the total population was 340 and in 2011 it had again increased to 357 according to the 2011 census.

Religion

According to the 2001 census, 281 out of 357 people in the Parish (78.7%) were Christian, this is above the national average of 59.3% (33.2 million people). The second highest religion was no religion, which showed 44 people (12.3%) of the population.

Occupation

According to the Vision of Britain website in 1881, the primary occupation was unknown for females, this may have been because at this time the majority of women were unemployed. For females, apart from unknown occupation the highest occupation was Domestic Service or Offices. (Prior to that, the general occupation was as Frame Work Knitters). In 1881 the majority of males in Smeeton Westerby either worked in Workers in Dress or Agriculture as they both scored the same of 30 people. In the 2001 census out of a possible 178 people in employment, 41 people were working in manufacturing of this roughly 73% were male. Manufacturing also scored individually the highest employment sector for males in 2001. The most common occupation for females in Smeeton Westerby in 2001 was working in real estate, renting and business activities, this employed 16 out of 77 females. In the 2011 census the total number of the population in employment decreased to 172 people. The largest employment sector was repair of motor vehicles and motor cycles of which 26 people were currently working. However, only just over the majority of people who worked in this employment sector were male (58%). In 2011 the highest employment sector for males was manufacturing which 17 out of 95 males worked in. The highest employment sector for females was employment in education which 16 out of 77 females worked in.

Housing

The first census to report how people were housed was in 1891. However the question and information given was very limited and the only statistics gathered were the number of rooms and the number of people in each household. This changed from 1951 onwards, as the census reports became more detailed and more questions were asked about amenities. In 1951 these "amenities" were measured by piped water, a cooking stove, a kitchen sink, a water closet (meaning a flush toilet) and a fixed bath. The total number of houses has changed over the years in Smeeton Westerby, but not dramatically, in 1881 the total number of houses was 99, this fell to 85 in 1901. The houses then very gradually increased, in 1951 the total number was 100, in 1961 it was 98 houses and in 2001 it was 144. Finally in the 2011 census the number of houses was 154 showing that the number of houses in Smeeton Westerby is increasing more rapidly.

Transport

While no train station lies at the heart of Smeeton Westerby it does have four train stations within 8 miles of the village. The nearest railway station is South Wigston (closed 1962) which is four miles North West of Smeeton Westerby. Narbrough railway station is six miles West, Leicester railway station is seven miles North West and finally Market Harbourough railway station is eight miles South East of Smeeton Westerby.

Trivia

There is an ancient burial site of the Beaker people just outside the village, which had been forgotten until its discovery in 1975.

The main source of income for people in Smeeton Westerby is farming.

The local village pub is The Kings Head.

References

External links

 Smeeton Westerby at Harborough Online

Villages in Leicestershire
Civil parishes in Harborough District